The Boobay and Tekla Show (also known as TBATS) is a Philippine television comedy talk show broadcast by YouTube and GMA Network. The show premiered as a streaming television show on YouTube in 2018. Directed by Rico Gutierrez and Frasco Mortiz, it is hosted by Boobay and Super Tekla. It premiered on terrestrial television on January 27, 2019 on the network's Sunday Grande sa Gabi line up.

Hosts
 Boobay
 Super Tekla

The Mema Squad
 Pepita Curtis 
 Ian Red 
 Jennie Gabriel 
 Buboy Villar 
 John Vic De Guzman 
 Jessica Villarubin

Production
In March 2020, the admission of a live audience in the studio and production were suspended due to the enhanced community quarantine in Luzon caused by the COVID-19 pandemic. The show resumed its programming on September 13, 2020.

Ratings
According to AGB Nielsen Philippines' Nationwide Urban Television Audience Measurement People in Television Homes, the pilot episode of The Boobay and Tekla Show earned a 5.3% rating. The show got its highest rating on May 12, 2019 with a 7.7% rating.

Accolades

References

External links
 
 

2018 web series debuts
2019 Philippine television series debuts
Comedy web series
Filipino-language television shows
GMA Network original programming
Non-fiction web series
Philippine comedy television series
Philippine television talk shows
Television productions suspended due to the COVID-19 pandemic